Michele Pena is an American politician. She is a Republican member of the Arizona House of Representatives elected to represent District 23 in 2022. 

Pena is the daughter of an immigrant. She was raised in Yuma, Arizona. Pena lived in Tucson before returning to Yuma.

References

External links 

 
 Biography at Ballotpedia

Republican Party members of the Arizona House of Representatives
Living people
Year of birth missing (living people)
21st-century American women politicians
Women state legislators in Arizona
Hispanic and Latino American state legislators in Arizona
21st-century American politicians
Hispanic and Latino American women in politics